Rasht (also romanized as Resht and Rast, and often spelt Recht in French and older German manuscripts) is the capital city of Gilan Province, Iran. Also known as the "City of Rain", it had a population of 679,995 as of the 2016 census and is the most populated city of northern Iran.

Rasht is the largest city on Iran's Caspian Sea coast. Due to being between the coast and the mountains, the local environment is rainy with humid subtropical and mediterranean influences. It also has temperate rainforest to its south, contrasting to the mostly arid Iran. It is a major trade center between Caucasia, Russia, and Iran using the port of Bandar-e Anzali. Rasht is also a major tourist center with the resort of Masouleh in the adjacent mountains and the beaches of Caspian as some of the major attractions.

Historically, Rasht was a major transport and business center which connected Iran to Russia and the rest of Europe, and because of this was known as the "Gate of Europe". The city has a history that goes back to the 13th century but its modern history dates back to the Safavid era during which Rasht was a major silk trade center with numerous textile workshops. In 2015, this city joined the network of creative cities of the world as a creative gastronomy city under the supervision of UNESCO.

History

Timeline
682: Rasht was first mentioned in Umayyad historical documents.
1669: Stenka Razin, a Cossack warlord, plundered the city.
1714: Rasht destroyed by earthquake.
1722–1732: Occupation by the Russians due to the Russo-Persian War.
1901: A major epidemic plague devastates the city.
1917–1920: The Russian and British armed forces fight in the port city of Bandar-e Anzali and Rasht. The British retreat and the Russians occupy the area.
1920–1921: The short-lived Gilan Soviet Socialist Republic was established with its capital in Rasht.
1937: A revolt, sparked by the desire to collect a "road tax" from the Russians, was suppressed.
1974: First university established in Rasht.

Rasht was first mentioned in Umayyad historical documents in 682 CE, but it is certainly older than this and appears on the Peutinger Map of late antiquity. It has seen the Sassanid era, the Rashidun conquest, the armies of Peter the Great and later Russian rulers, and British colonialism. The people of Rasht also played a major role in the Constitutional Revolution of Iran.

The name Rasht comes most plausibly from the verb , weaving. Rasht has, along with regions around Tabriz and Tehran, one of the earliest industry plants during the last quarter of the 19th century, prominently in fields such as fishing, caviar production, the Caspian sea oil pipeline construction and textiles. During the 20th century, until the mid-70s, Gilan and the Rasht region was the third-ranking industrial city in Iran by number of workers and per capital productivity. It lost its cultural and industrial status to a large extent after the 1970s.

The people of Rasht played a prominent role in instigation and radicalization of the Persian Constitutional Revolution (1905–1907). Rasht is the birthplace of Mīrzā Kūchak Khān, one of the leading figures of the Constitutional Revolution. His own movement in Gilan, which went by the name of Jangalis, represented a pro-modern and social democratic program for reformation of Muslim rituals and traditions. Mirza established the short-lived Persian Socialist Soviet Republic in 1920 after the defeat of the constitutional forces and in coalition with Iranian communists. The republic had the support of the newly established Russian Red Army. The Soviet Government, after a turn of military and political strategy proposed by Trotsky, withdrew its support and the republic itself was tormented by the inner conflicts between the newly established Iranian Communist Party (1919) and the Jangalis and other factions. The republic was finally defeated by the Iranian army under the command of Reza Shah.

The first national library of Iran was established in Rasht under the Qajar dynasty. Furthermore, Nasim e Shomal as the first modern newspaper of Iran after the constitutional revolution has been published in Rasht, but later moved its headquarters to Qazvin. First Public Library of Iran was built in Rasht City. First Branch of the First Iranian Bank (Sepah Bank) was located in Rasht City.  First branch of 24/7 pharmacy (Karoon pharmacy) was built in Rasht City. First school for girls and first fire station in Iran were also built in Rasht City. The city of Rasht was the center of Gilan and the center of the first province of the country.
During the Qajar period, along with economic development between Iran and Russia, Noghan trade and other products expanded. Thus, Rasht became the gateway to Europe in the 19th century. Gregory Valeriano Vich Melgunov, a Russian traveler who traveled to Rasht in 1275 AH, wrote in his memoirs that the city at that time had 546 houses, 1021 shops and a population of 27,314. At that time, Rasht's political credibility was such that the Russian, British, and Ottoman governments had consulates in Rasht.

Modern day

Rasht is turning into an industrialized town like most of the Iranian large cities and province capitals. Enjoying the Kadus International Hotel and hundreds of tourist attractions, Rasht receives thousands of foreign tourists annually, mostly from Austria, Germany, Netherlands, France, Australia, Japan and African countries like Senegal and Cameroon as well as countries from Oceania like Micronesia. Rasht is known for its famous municipal building, located in the Square of Municipality, which was constructed circa 1900, and has been renovated each year. Due to the high amount of humidity in Rasht which damages and destroys the aged buildings, the native, older architectural texture of Rasht is gradually being replaced with the modern skyscrapers and apartments.

The culture of consumerism is prevalent among the people of Rasht as a cultural and urban center which is historically engaged in close commercial and political ties with the United Kingdom, Russia and France. Due to this background which makes the inhabitants much familiar with the industrial, cultural and political developments of the west, the finance and credit institutions are more willing to open representative offices and bureaus in Rasht and it has made the city a center of various banks and financial organizations. There are many commercial centers, malls and financial institutions in Rasht including one branch of the Exports Development Bank of Iran which is an international bank dealing with the Iranian exports. The organizers and directors of national Iranian or non-Iranian banks afford to spend considerable amounts of budgets to construct attractive and modern buildings for their offices in Rasht.

Since the Islamic Revolution of 1979 in Iran, there have always been requests on behalf of Russian, Turkish and Azeri banks to open branches in Rasht and that is why the city is endowed as the "gate of Europe" in Iran. The head consulate of the Russian Federation government is located in Rasht and some of the other Caspian region countries are also keen to establish representative headquarters in Rasht alongside their embassies in Tehran. Some evidences are the University of Gilan which was constructed jointly by the governments of Iran and West Germany about 40 years ago, the building of IRIB representatives in Rasht which was constructed jointly by the Iranian and Belgian engineers.

First of Iran 

 The first branch of Bank Sepah and first Bank of Iran was established in Rasht in 1925
 The first girls' school in Iran was established in Rasht
 The first day & night pharmacy in Iran was established in Rasht
 The first sanatorium for the elderly and disabled in Iran was established in Rasht
 The first National Library of Iran was established in Rasht in 1920
 The first bus Iran arrived in Rasht
 The first city in which the sewage system was established
 The first city in which the Russian, British, French and Ottoman governments opened their consulates and had political representatives.
 The first silk factory in Iran
 The first national hospital in Iran named Poursina Hospital
 The first classical theater in Iran

Climate
Rasht has a humid subtropical climate (Köppen: Cfa, Trewartha: Cf). The climate is one of the wettest in Iran, with warm summers and cool winters, sometimes with snow. The average humidity is 81.2%, contrasting heavily with cities in many other parts of Iran. Sunshine hours, averaging roughly 1,520 per year, are lower than in most places in Iran and also compared to most places at this latitude. Rasht is also known as "The City of Rain".

Demography

The city of Rasht is the most populated city in the north of the country and one of the metropolises of Iran. According to the census results of 2010, the population of Rasht is 639,951 people, and the population of Rasht city is 918,445 people. According to the official census in 2015, its resident population was 956,971 people. The daily constant floating population The city of Rasht as the mother city of Gilan province has over 1,200,000 people.The population of this city is over two million people during holidays and tourist months of the year.

Demographics

Language 
People of Rasht are mostly Gilaks (98/2%) and they speak Rashti variety of Western Gilaki language.

Culture
People of Rasht spend much on arts, food, and clothes. They spend the leisure times going to cinemas, art exhibitions, music concerts and international book fairs that are being held in the city most of times in a year. Also the municipality kicks off sports, cultural or IT-related competitions to involve the youth in healthy and constructive activities. The most beloved competition is the annual blogging competition which awards the top young bloggers each year.

Rasht has been playing a major role in Iranian history. It was Iran's gateway to Russia and Europe; therefore it was influenced by western architecture. Iran's first public library was built here and it was the first city in Iran where girls were allowed to go to school.

Iranian cities of Isfahan and Rasht were accepted to the UNESCO Creative Cities Network on December 11, 2015. Isfahan is registered because of its creative crafts and folk art; and Rasht because of its unique gastronomy. Rasht embroidery is a handicraft and art specific to the city and Gilan province.

On 4 January 2015, Rasht was selected as the political center of Gilan more than 4,500 years ago. The date 4 January was then included in the official calendar of the country as Rasht Day.

Historical and natural attractions

Municipal Complex
Iran Hotel
Post Building
National Library
Tomb of Mirza Kuchak Khan
Mirza Kuchak Khaan House
Safi Mosque
Kolah Farangi Mansion
Sabzeh Meydan Park
Gilan Rural Heritage Museum
Saravan Forest Park
Gilan Rural Heritage Museum
Rasht Museum of Anthropology
Avanesian House
Rasht Grand Market
Hajj Samad Khan Mosque
Haj Samiee Mosque
Badyollah Mosque
Qadiri House of Rasht
Mirza Khalil House
Governor's Building
Mohtasham Garden
Mafakher Park
Emamzadeh Hashem
Imamzadeh Ismail and Abbas
Mellat Park
Eynak Lagoon
Keshavarz Park
Meshkat Park
Towhid Park
Golshan Mosque
Kase Forushan Mosque
Zargaran Mosque
Abrishamchi House
Ashkouri House
Seyyed Ali Moghimi House
Mohtasham Caravanserai
Haji Bath
Ebrahim Pourdavoud Tomb
Chomarsara Clay Bridge
Gishe Damerdeh Bridge
Gurab-e Lishavandan
Tomb of Imam's sister
Imamzadeh Bibi Zeynab
Tomb Tower Danaye Ali
Siah Estalakh Village
Lat Carvansary
Shahid Beheshti High School
Ghasr-e Bazi Rasht
Mahan Bird's Garden

Cuisine
The dominant foods of Rasht people are various types of fish. Mirza Ghassemi, vavishka (a type of haggis), nargesi, baghala ghatogh, and ashpal (roe) are some other popular local dishes. Reshteh khoshkar is a well-known sweet. Zeitoun Parvardeh is a kind of delicacy prepared from olives and pomegranates; it is a popular seasoning in the city.

Sports

The people of Rasht have always been regular fans of football which is the beloved sport in the city. Most are fans of Damash Gilan who play in the Azadegan League or Sepidrood Rasht who play in the Persian Gulf Pro League. Damash Gilan is the newer version of former Pegah football club that belonged to the municipality of Rasht, but was purchased later by the mineral water factory of Damash and changed its name and properties to Damash Gilan. The home stadium of Damash Gilan is Dr. Azodi Stadium which is an old stadium dating back to almost 40 years ago and its capacity is 11,000 people. Sardar Jangal Stadium is the cities second stadium.

Following football, wrestling, judo and weightlifting are the most popular sports of youth in Rasht and that is due to the enchanting appearance of Iranian wrestlers and weightlifters in the international competitions like Olympics. The outstanding figure of world weightlifting and the two-time olympics Gold medal winner Hossein Rezazadeh is a main inspirer of Rasht youth to try Weightlifting as their professional job. Asghar Ebrahimi who was the squad captain of Iranian weightlifting team at the 2008 Olympics is from Rasht and a successful example of those youth from Rasht who tried this national field of sport after Hossein Rezazadeh.

Pharmaceutical industry
At present, Rasht has a Faculty of Pharmacy under the auspices of Gilan University of Medical Sciences and several drug production centers, one of which is a center for the production of anti-cancer nano-drugs with 24 pens. Sobhan Daroo Co. is one of the most successful pharmaceutical companies in Iran. And with more than 100 production licenses, it is currently the second largest producer in the country in terms of production volume. Sobhan Oncology Pharmaceutical Company is one of the most modern and advanced production units of anti-cancer and chemotherapy products in the world.

Colleges and universities

 University of Gilan
 Gilan university of medical sciences
 Islamic Azad University of Rasht
 Jaber ebn Hayyan Institute of Higher Education
 Payame Noor University
 Institute of Higher Education for Academic Jihad of Rasht 
 Guilan Technical & Vocational Training Organization
 Gilan Advanced Skills Training Center
 Rasht Technical and Vocational Institute
 Guilan University of Applied and Scientific Technology

Economy
This city is greatly important based on its geographical situation (locating on the central  plain and its large width, fertile lands and soil, being the most important region of the province and Iran in terms of  rice cultivation), communicative situation (locating among Tehran–Qazvin-Anzali-Astara roads, in one hand, and the main road from Gilan to Mazandaran and the east of Gilan, on the other hand), political–administrative situation (situating as the capital city of Gilan province) and economic development, towns expansion and industrial factories and the following increase in the agricultural-commercial activities  and in the number of science and technology centers. The most residents of this city are active in service, trading and industrial jobs and paddy is the main activities of the villagers in this region.
Rasht has long been one of the most prominent customs cities in Iran. This city used to be the only communication and trade route of Iran to Europe through the Anzali port. From the time of Shah Abbas II until the end of the Qajar rule, the city of Rasht was a large commercial center, and caravans stopped in this city to buy silk and sell their goods from In this way, they were sent to the ports of the Mediterranean Sea. The presence of the Russian Consulate and then the British Consulate in Rasht caused the economic and social prosperity of this city, and there was a representative of the Ministry of Foreign Affairs or a broker, a Russian consul, a French deputy consul, and a British deputy consul in this city, and apart from The ruler of Rasht, the agent of foreign affairs was also stationed in Rasht on behalf of the central government. During this period, Tomanians Russian Borrowing Bank and Trading House were active in Rasht consecutively. At the same time, Rasht's foreign trade developed and most Rashtites became millionaires, and Rasht became an aristocratic city during the Qajar period. The city is served by Refah Chain Stores Co., Iran Hyper Star, Isfahan City Center, Shahrvand Chain Stores Inc., Ofoq Kourosh chain store.

Transportation

Taxi
In 1947, 50 taxis were purchased from England by the order of Fakhr-ol-dowleh (daughter of Muzaffar al-Din Shah) and imported to Iran. In 1948, the first taxi entered Rasht by crossing the main street of the city due to his interest in Gilan. Rasht Metropolitan Taxi Organization has so far organized more than 9,500 taxis and private cars.

Railway
Rasht is served by Rasht railway station.
There are daily train departures from Tehran to Rasht, leave Tehran at 07:45 and arrive Rasht in 13:10. The non-reduced ticket price costs 430,000 Rials (2 euros 50 cents in May 2019) and can be bought either online from the Iranian railway website or in travel agencies. The railway passes through Alborz mountains and then Sefidrood river valley and stops in Karaj and Qazvin on its way to Rasht.

International airport
The Rasht International airport is the only airport in the small province of Gilan and was established in 1969 with an approximate area of 220 hectares. At first, the airport just handled domestic flights to Tehran and Mashhad, but after it was renamed to Sardar Jangal International airport in 2007, additional routes were established.

The airport is in close affiliation with hundreds of flights by national and international airlines, including Mahan Air, Iran Air, Iran Aseman Airlines, Kish Air and receives more than 2000 flights annually.

Streets and boulevards

 Golsar Street
 Imam Ali Boulevard
 Shahid Chamran Boulevard
 Ayatollah Taleghani Boulevard
 Resalat Street
 Shohaday-e Gomnam Boulevard
 Ostadsara Street
 Esteghamat Street
 Deylaman Boulevard
 Moallem Boulevard
 Imam Khomeini Boulevard
 Valiasr Street
 Enghelab Street
 Azadi Street
 Azadegan Boulevard
 Shahid Ansari Street
 Farhang Street
 Parastar Boulevard
 Bastani Shoaar Street
 Afakhra Street
 Pasdaran Street
 22 Bahman Boulevard
 Alamolhoda Street
 Saadi Street
 Tohid Street
 Navab Street
 Gilan Boulevard
 Gholipour Boulevard
 Habibzadeh Boulevard
 Ansari Boulevard
 Suleman Darab Boulevard
 Takhti Street
 Bisotun Street

Rose de Rescht

Rosa 'de Rescht', like many old garden roses, presents an interesting historical background story. 
This cultivar, originating in Iran, was reported at the end of 19th century in England, but it was then forgotten. 
It was rediscovered near the Iranian provincial capital of Rascht by Miss Nancy Lindsay in 1945, and was brought back to the United Kingdom, where it was re-introduced around 1950.
Today it is shown in the Victorian Class, winning many trophies.

Notable people

Hushang Ebtehaj The intellectual poet of 20th century in Iran
Hossein Sami'i (1876 – 1953) Iranian writer, poet, diplomat and politician
Mirza Kuchik Khan One of the martyrs of freedom in Iran
Aydin Aghdashloo (1940) Iranian painter, graphist and art curator
Reza Baluchi (Born 1972) athlete
Mahmoud Behzad The father of modern biology of Iran
Mir Abdolrez Daryabeigi Painter
Mohammad Bagher Nobakht Iranian politician and economist
Fathollah Khan Akbar Iranian Prime Minister
Amir Eftekhari Footballer
Khosrow Golsorkhi Journalist, poet, and communist activist
Hadi Jelveh Associate Justice of the Iran Supreme Court
Alexander Kasimovich Kazembek Orientalist, historian and philologist 
Mohammad Khatam Iranian air force commander and advisor to the Shah
Hamideh Kheirabadi Former Actress
Arsen Minasian The Armenian founder of the first modern sanatorium in Iran
Mohammad Moein Linguistics and literature researcher
Ardeshir Mohassess Cartoonist
Youcef Nadarkhani Christian pastor sentenced to death for apostasy from Islam
Mahmoud Namjoo The world's weightlifting champion
Ardeshir Ovanessian Communist leader
Mohammad Nouri Singer
Kazim Rashti He was a Shaykhi scholar
Ebrahim Poordavood Academic
Dariush Ramezani Cartoonist
Fazlollah Reza Former Iran's ambassador to UNICEF and former manager of Sharif University
Anoushiravan Rohani Musician
Massoumeh Seyhoun Painter
Sadeq Saba Head of BBC Persian Service
Majid Samiei Neurosurgeon and the Manager of Hanover Brain and Nerves Treatment institute
Marjane Satrapi World award-winning film director
Susan Taslimi Actress
Yahya Rahmat-Samii Northrop Grumman chair professor
Farideh Lashai Painting
Homayoon Toufighi Iranian chess grandmaster
Houchang Nahavandi Iranian professor
Habib Nafisi Engineer
Houman Seyyedi Iranian actor and director
Shohreh Bayat Iranian chess arbiter
Asghar Ebrahimi Iranian weightlifter
Mahmoud Etemadzadeh Writer
Enayatollah Reza Iranian historian
Reza Ramezani Gilani Muslim cleric
Esmaeil Elmkhah Iranian weightlifter
Nasrollah Moghtader Mojdehi Iranian professor
Mohammad Tolouei Writer
Asghar Kardoust Basketball player
Mohammad Rahbari Fencer
Babak Zarrin Composer
Mohsen Forouzan Footballer
Hadi Tabatabaei Footballer
Saeid Hassanipour Karateka

Health centers and hotels

Hotel

Hospital

Distance
Away with some of the major cities in Iran:

Twin towns – sister cities

Rasht is twinned with:
 Astrakhan, Russia
 Moscow, Russia
 Schwäbisch Hall, Germany
 Multan, Pakistan
 Trabzon, Turkey
 Rasht District, Tajikistan

References

External links 

 Rasht Municipality Organization شهرداري رشت
 Damash Rasht Football Team Fans Site
 Gilan Province
 Iran Chamber Society: Rasht
 Iran Chamber of commerce, Industries & Mines: Gilan
 Encyclopedia of the Orient 
 Info Please
 Photos of Rasht in Panoramio

 
Populated places in Rasht County
Cities in Gilan Province
Iranian provincial capitals
Populated places on the Caspian Sea
Populated places along the Silk Road
Gilak settlements in Gilan Province